Navneet Singh (born 7 December 1994) is an Indian cricketer. He made his first-class debut for Services in the 2017–18 Ranji Trophy on 6 October 2017. He made his Twenty20 debut on 17 November 2019, for Services in the 2019–20 Syed Mushtaq Ali Trophy.

References

External links
 

1994 births
Living people
Indian cricketers
Place of birth missing (living people)
Services cricketers